The following is the discography of Ween, a Pennsylvania-based experimental alternative band formed by childhood friends Aaron Freeman and Mickey Melchiondo, better known by their respective stage names, Gene Ween and Dean Ween. Starting out with a few locally released demo tapes, including The Crucial Squeegie Lip, AXIS: Bold as Boognish, and The Live Brain Wedgie / WAD Excerpts, the band was picked up by independent label Twin/Tone Records in 1990 and released their debut GodWeenSatan: The Oneness. In 1991 they signed with another independent label, Shimmy-Disc, and released The Pod. Later, Ween signed with Elektra Records and released their major label debut Pure Guava in 1992. It features their highest-charting single to date, "Push th' Little Daisies". While touring for this album, they played at Chapel Hill, North Carolina, which would later be released as a CD/DVD live album in 2008 titled At the Cat's Cradle, 1992.

In 1994 Chocolate and Cheese was released, which spawned the singles "Voodoo Lady", "Freedom of '76", and "I Can't Put My Finger on It". Ween's next album, released in 1996, was titled 12 Golden Country Greats and was recorded with several prominent Nashville musicians, featuring a distinct country sound. It gave way to the singles "Piss Up a Rope" and "You Were the Fool". The nautically-themed album The Mollusk followed in 1997. It is considered a prog rock concept album, and featured the singles "Mutilated Lips" and "Ocean Man", the latter gaining a significant following after being a song on the SpongeBob SquarePants Movie soundtrack. The band's desire to pursue alternate forms of media led to the MP3-only release Craters of the Sac, presented by Melchiondo for online download and free trade. The same year the band had planned to release a live album compilation spanning their entire career up to that point, titled Paintin' the Town Brown: Ween Live 1990-1998. However, according to Melchiondo, once the album was completed, Elektra realized the sales potential of the CD and denied Ween the right to release it through their independent label. Ween's sixth studio album, White Pepper, was the band's final studio release for Elektra and was released in 2000. The pop-themed, Lennon-McCartney-inspired album produced two singles: "Even If You Don't", which was made into a music video directed by Trey Parker and Matt Stone, and "Stay Forever".

Ween formed their own label in 2001, Chocodog Records, the label Ween originally planned to release Paintin' the Town Brown on. Later, Ween released the first official Chocodog album, Live in Toronto, Canada. The limited-pressing CD, available exclusively through the band website, became an instant collector's item. Subsequent Chocodog releases were produced in higher volumes to meet demand. Ween signed to Sanctuary Records and released Quebec, their first studio release in three years, in 2003. Later that year, the band held a poll on their official message boards to select songs for the band to play on their forthcoming live-in-studio album All Request Live. Released on November 22, the album would be the first  time Ween would play all five parts of "The Stallion" (Parts 1 & 2 from The Pod, Part 3 from Pure Guava, the unreleased Part 4, and Part 5 from Craters of the Sac). The performance also included rarely-played early Ween tracks such as "Pollo Asado", "Mononucleosis" and "Cover it with Gas and Set it in Fire", as well as Ween's rejected Pizza Hut jingle, "Where'd the Cheese Go?". In 2004, Ween released Live in Chicago, a DVD and CD set that compiled tracks from two live performances from the Quebec tour at Chicago's Vic Theatre in November 2003.

In 2005, Ween hit the studio to record better quality versions of previously-unreleased songs for the compilation Shinola, Vol. 1. The twelve tracks were all, according to Melchiondo, "songs we regretted not putting on other records". The tracks spanned the band's career, from "Tastes Good on th' Bun", a Pod outtake, to "Someday", a Quebec outtake. Different versions of three of the songs, "Big Fat Fuck", "How High Can You Fly?" and "Monique the Freak" had previously appeared on Craters of the Sac.

In 2006, Ween rented an old farmhouse and converted it into a working studio. After writing over 50 songs and recording rough versions through 2006, they picked through them and, with Andrew Weiss as producer, re-recorded album versions for what would become The Friends EP and the full-length La Cucaracha which were both released in 2007 on Rounder Records. La Cucaracha, which would prove to be Ween's final album, would later be called a "big piece of shit" by Freeman, adding, "I think the songs on it were good, or a bunch of songs, but overall that was a big clue Mickey and I were finito".

In 2011, Melchiondo quietly released an MP3-only collection of songs called The Caesar Demos, named after the band's original working title for Quebec, to friends on his Facebook page. In his comment, he stated the songs were all recorded between 2001 and 2003 while Claude Coleman was recovering from injuries sustained in a car accident, and that many of the tracks featured only himself and Freeman. In addition to a handful of tracks that eventually made Quebec, Caesar Demos would also feature several previously unreleased tracks.

The band broke up in 2012, after Freeman commented in a Rolling Stone interview that it was time to pursue solo projects. The manager for the band, Greg Frey, later confirmed he had decided to 'end his musical relationship' with Ween. Melchiondo was unaware of this until it was public information. In 2015, Freeman began using the Gene Ween moniker again for live performances, and later that year they announced their first shows in years for 2016. A sequel to the first outtakes collection, Shinola vol. 1, was confirmed to be in the works by Melchiondo on Facebook in 2016. A live album containing a 2001 performance of every song from their first album was released in 2016, entitled GodWeenSatan Live.

Studio albums

Live albums

Compilation albums
 Craters of the Sac (1999)
 Shinola, Vol. 1 (2005)
 Bananas and Blow (2018) - Unauthorized Warner release

EPs

Singles

Music videos
"Pollo Asado"
"Captain Fantasy"
"Pork Roll Egg and Cheese"
"Push th' Little Daisies"
"Freedom of '76"
"I Can't Put My Finger on It"
"Roses Are Free"
"Voodoo Lady"
"Even If You Don't"
"Transdermal Celebration"

Early independent releases

Notable demo tapes

Appearances

References

Discography
Discographies of American artists